Vinica is a municipality in eastern part of North Macedonia. Vinica is also the name of the town where the municipal seat is found. Vinica Municipality is part of the Eastern Statistical Region.

Geography
The municipality borders Kočani Municipality and Makedonska Kamenica Municipality to the north, Delčevo Municipality to the east, Radoviš Municipality and Berovo Municipality to the south, and Zrnovci Municipality to the west.

History
By the 2003 territorial division of Macedonia, the rural Blatec Municipality was attached to Vinica Municipality.

Demographics
According to the 2002 Macedonian census, Vinica Municipality has 19,938 residents. Ethnic groups in the municipality:
Macedonians = 18,261 (91.6%)
Roma = 1,230 (6.2%)
others.

Inhabited places
The number of the inhabited places in the municipality is 16.

References

External links
Official website

Municipalities of North Macedonia
Eastern Statistical Region
 

it:Vinica